Maksym Ilchysh (born 5 November 1992) is a professional Ukrainian football defender who played for FC Karlivka in the Ukrainian Second League

Ilchysh is the product of the Sportive School of Molod Poltava. His first trainers were Oleksandr Yezhakov and Serhiy Khodoryev.

He signed 3-years deal with the Cypriot football club AEL Limassol in February 2013, and in October of the same year returned in Ukraine.

References

External links
Profile at Official FFU site (Ukr)

1992 births
Living people
Ukrainian footballers
FC Vorskla Poltava players
FC Kremin Kremenchuk players
Association football defenders
Expatriate footballers in Cyprus
Cypriot First Division players
AEL Limassol players
Ukrainian expatriate footballers
Sportspeople from Poltava